is a Japanese footballer currently playing as a goalkeeper for Zweigen Kanazawa.

Career statistics

Club
.

Notes

References

External links

1996 births
Living people
Takushoku University alumni
Japanese footballers
Association football goalkeepers
SC Sagamihara players